Norman Clifford Mager (March 23, 1926 – March 17, 2005) was an American professional basketball player who played in the National Basketball Association for the Baltimore Bullets during the 1950–51 NBA season. Mager is also notable as a key member of the 1949–50 CCNY Beavers men's basketball team, the only team in NCAA history to win both the National Invitation Tournament and NCAA tournament in the same year.

College career 
Mager, a  forward from Lafayette High School in Brooklyn, was a senior during the 1949–50 season. He averaged 3.6 points per game during the season, but had a strong postseason, averaging 12.6 points per game in the 1950 NCAA tournament and was named to the All-Eastern regional team. He was also important in the Beavers' NIT run, averaging 4.7 points per game.

Professional career

Baltimore Bullets (1950-1951) 
Following the close of his collegiate career, Mager was drafted in the fifth round of the 1950 NBA draft by the Baltimore Bullets. Mager played 22 games for the Bullets, averaging 4.6 points and 2.0 rebounds per game. However, his career came to a premature end in the wake of the CCNY Point Shaving Scandal, where it was revealed that players on the team had taken money to manipulate the point-spread of several games. Mager was thrown out of the NBA and other members of the CCNY team were banned for life from the league.

Personal life 
Mager became an executive with a janitorial supply company, retiring in 2000. He died of cancer on March 17, 2005, in Boynton Beach, Florida.

References

1926 births
2005 deaths
American men's basketball players
Baltimore Bullets (1944–1954) draft picks
Baltimore Bullets (1944–1954) players
Banned National Basketball Association players
Basketball players from New York City
CCNY Beavers men's basketball players
Deaths from cancer in Florida
Forwards (basketball)
Lafayette High School (New York City) alumni
Sportspeople from Brooklyn